Sugar is a musical with a book by Peter Stone, music by Jule Styne, and lyrics by Bob Merrill. It is based on the 1959 film Some Like It Hot, for which he was awarded best performance ina musical, was adapted by Billy Wilder and I.A.L. Diamond from a story by Robert Thoeren and Michael Logan. It premiered on Broadway in 1972 and was staged in the West End twenty years later.

Synopsis
Two unemployed musicians, bass player Jerry and saxophone player Joe, witness the St. Valentine's Day Massacre in Chicago. In order to escape gangster Spats Palazzo and his henchmen, they dress as women and join Sweet Sue and Her Society Syncopaters, an all-female band about to leave town for an engagement at a Miami Beach hotel.

Complications arise when Joe, now known as Josephine, falls in love with beautiful band singer Sugar Kane, who has a slight drinking problem that tends to interfere with her ability to choose a romantic partner wisely. More than anything, Sugar wants to marry a millionaire, prompting Joe to disguise himself as the man of her dreams.

Meanwhile, wealthy and elderly Osgood Fielding Jr. is pursuing Daphne, unaware she really is Jerry in drag. As much as he knows he needs to reveal his true gender to his over-amorous paramour, Jerry is beginning to enjoy all the expensive gifts bestowed upon him on a regular basis.

Total chaos erupts when Spats and his gang descend upon the hotel and realize who Josephine and Daphne really are.

Productions
Produced by David Merrick and directed and choreographed by Gower Champion, Sugar opened on Broadway at the Majestic Theatre on April 9, 1972 after 14 previews and closed on June 23, 1973 after 505 performances. The opening night cast included Robert Morse as Jerry/Daphne, Tony Roberts as Joe/Josephine, Elaine Joyce as Sugar Kane, Cyril Ritchard as Osgood Fielding Jr., Sheila Smith as Sweet Sue, and Steve Condos as Spats Palazzo. Scenic design was by Robin Wagner, costume design by Alvin Colt, and lighting design by Martin Aronstein. Elaine Joyce was replaced by Pamela Blair later in the run.

In 1975 a version was produced in the Teatro de los Insurgentes of Mexico City. It starred the singer Enrique Guzmán and the actors Héctor Bonilla (alternando con Xavier López "Chabelo") and Sylvia Pasquel. Due to the tremendous success, the musical was staged in Madrid, Spain two years later with the majority of the original cast of Mexico.

In 1986 a very successful production was staged at the Lola Membrives theatre in Buenos Aires, Argentina. Susana Giménez as Sugar Kane, Arturo Puig as Joe/Josephine and Ricardo Darín as Jerry/Daphne was the stars of this version accompanied by Norma Pons, Ambar La Fox, Roberto Catarineu, Francisco Nápoli and Gogó Andreu as Osgood Fielding Jr. The director of this remembered stage version, which closed three years later in 1988, was Mario Morgan.

In 1990, a production of “Sugar” was staged at the theatre Pozorište na Terazijama in Belgrade, then Yugoslavia (modern day Serbia), under the title “Some like it hot” (Neki to vole vruće). The show was directed by Soja Jovanović, with Svetislav Goncić as Jerry/Daphne, Rade Marjanović as Joe/Josephine, and Ivana Mihić In the titular role of Sugar. The production was a smashing success, and went on to become the longest running production in the history of theatre in Serbia, continuously running for over 30 years, and is still running to this day. Over the years, almost all of the original cast members have left the show, except for the two principals in the roles of Jerry and Joe, who were the ones most responsible for the enduring success of the production. In 2022, Marjanović stepped down from the part of Joe and took over the part of Bienstok, with Žarko Stepanov taking on the part of Joe.

Performed in 1991 at the West Yorkshire Playhouse directed by Jude Kelly . Tommy Steel watched performance and 
The West End production, starring Tommy Steele, opened at the Prince Edward Theatre on March 19, 1992 and closed on June 20, 1992. The production reverted to the film's title of Some Like It Hot.

A 2002-03 United States national tour starred Tony Curtis as Osgood Fielding Jr. in a revised production, titled Some Like It Hot: The Musical. Curtis had played Joe in the original film. This national tour wardrobe is on display at the Costume World Broadway Collection in Pompano Beach, Florida.

A new production of the show ran at the Westchester Broadway Theatre in Elmsford, New York April 2010 through July 2010.

In February/March 2011 Pimlico Opera presented a new production in Great Britain at Send Prison in Surrey. The cast included professional actors and inmates.

On March 6, 2011, Musical Theatre West in Long Beach, California presented a staged concert version of the show, as part of the Reiner Reading Series with Larry Raben (Forever Plaid), Bets Malone (The Marvelous Wonderettes) and Nick Santa Maria (The Producers (musical)).

A Danish production of the show ran in 2011 at Folketeateret in Copenhagen under the title "Ingen er Fuldkommen" ("Nobody's Perfect"). The show opened in October and starred Danish musical actress Maria Lucia.

42nd Street Moon presented Sugar as part of its 19th Season, April 4–22, 2012.

In 2016 started a new production of the musical in Barcelona, Spain. The whole play was translated into Spanish and Catalan and had been in theaters until April 2018.

In 2019, the musical is returning to Teatro de los Insurgentes, in Mexico City, to be premiered on October 17. The cast includes famous Mexican actors like Arath de la Torre and Ariel Miramontes.

Song list

Act I
 "When You Meet a Man in Chicago" - Sweet Sue and All Girl Band
 "Penniless Bums" - Jerry, Joe and Unemployed Musicians
 "Tear the Town Apart" - Spats's Gang
 "The Beauty That Drives Men Mad" - Jerry and Joe
 "We Could Be Close" - Jerry and Sugar Kane
 "Sun on My Face" - Jerry, Joe, Sugar Kane, Sweet Sue, Bienstock and Ensemble
 "November Song" - Millionaires and Osgood Fielding Jr.
 "Sugar - Jerry and Joe

Act II
 "Hey, Why Not!" - Sugar Kane and Ensemble
 "Beautiful Through and Through" - Osgood Fielding Jr. and Jerry
 "What Do You Give to a Man Who's Had Everything?" - Joe and Sugar Kane
 "Magic Nights" - Jerry
 "It's Always Love" - Joe
 "When You Meet a Man in Chicago" - Jerry, Joe, Sugar Kane, Sweet Sue, All Girl Band and Chorus Line
A final song, "People in My Life" (Sugar), was taken out during the previews, but has appeared in some later productions.

Critical reception
In his review of the Broadway production, Time theatre critic T.E. Kalem thought the musical "has been so thoroughly processed, refined and filtered that it has lost the natural energy that makes a good musical strong and healthy." He added, "If hummable songs are a plus, Jule Styne's songs are hummable, though you may not know quite which homogenized number you are humming. As for Bob Merrill's lyrics, they are the labored products of a man hovering over a rhyming dictionary. Sugar is almost a textbook case of a musical born after its time. It may well enjoy great wads of audience favor. But in the past three years, Company and Follies have altered the critical perspective by providing a musical form that is spare, intelligent, ironic, mature and capable of sustaining three-dimensional characters." He concluded, "This is not to say that the big, old-fashioned musical is irrevocably doomed, but it must have a singular mood, manner and meaning all its own. Otherwise, all that remains, as Sugar indicates, is a sterile display of high-gloss techniques."

Dyan McBride, director of a 2012 San Francisco production of the musical, noted in an interview that "Written in 1972, Sugar really has one of the last Golden Age of Broadway scores.... You can feel contemporary Broadway starting to come.... This is not a rock 'n' roll score; this is really a jazzy score. But you can start to hear things changing; there's a little bit of lounge, and you can hear some Bob Goulet."

Awards and nominations

Original Broadway production

See also
Some Like It Hot (musical)

References

External links

Sugar synopsis at tamswitmark.com
"Some Like It Hot Plays Newark's NJPAC, a Stone's Throw From NYC, Feb. 4-9", Playbill.com article with production history, February 4, 2003

1972 musicals
Broadway musicals
West End musicals
Musicals based on films
Musicals by Jule Styne
Musicals by Peter Stone